Baby Bob is an American sitcom television series that premiered on CBS as a midseason replacement on March 18, 2002, and aired two seasons through June 20, 2003. The Baby Bob character had previously been on television since February 2000, appearing in commercials for FreeInternet.com. While actual infants played Bob, the effect to make him look like he was talking was achieved through computer editing.

Synopsis
The series centered on first-time parents Walter Spencer (Adam Arkin) and his wife Lizzy (Joely Fisher), and their six-month-old baby Bob (voiced by Ken Hudson Campbell). After discovering that their son can talk like an adult, Walter decides that they must keep it a secret. Lizzy, however, wants to show off Bob's talking skills, especially to her mother Madeline (Holland Taylor), who constantly brags about her other grandchildren. Supporting cast members included Elliott Gould as Walter's father Sam, and Marissa Tait as Bob's babysitter Teala.

Cast
 Joely Fisher as Lizzy Collins Spencer
 Adam Arkin as Walter Spencer
 Holland Taylor as Madeline Collins
 Elliott Gould as Sam Spencer
 Ken Hudson Campbell as the voice of Bob Spencer
 Marissa Tait as Teala

Episodes

Series overview

Season 1 (2002)

Season 2 (2003)

Reception and cancellation

The series was panned by critics but premiered to strong ratings and placed 15th in its first week. Baby Bob wrapped its first season, consisting of six episodes, in April 2002 with CBS planning a second season of thirteen episodes. However, CBS decided to shift its programming budget to its new series My Big Fat Greek Life and cut the second season order for Baby Bob to eight episodes. The second season of Baby Bob remained unaired for over a year until CBS aired the episodes in summer 2003.

After the show's run ended, the Baby Bob character returned to television in a series of commercials for Quizno's.

In 2002, TV Guide ranked Baby Bob number 14 on its '50 Worst TV Shows of All Time' list.

References

External links
 
 

2000s American sitcoms
2002 American television series debuts
2003 American television series endings
CBS original programming
English-language television shows
Television series by CBS Studios
Works based on advertisements